= Stephanie Ovadia =

American attorney and radio show host

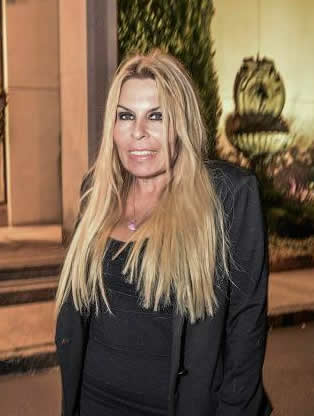
- Stephanie Ovadia
- Citizenship: American
- Occupation: Attorney
- Website: lawofficestephanieovadia.com

Stephanie G. Ovadia is a New York State attorney and a radio show host.

== Education ==
Stephanie Ovadia received a B.A. in Political Science from Binghamton University in 1980. She obtained a paralegal program certificate from Adelphi University in 1981. In 1984, she received her J.D. from the Southwestern University School of Law.

== Career ==
Ovadia started practising after law school. In 1993, she founded the Law Office of Stephanie G. Ovadia, where she is currently practising as a licensed New York State attorney. Her law office is located in South Hempstead in New York, previously located in East Meadow.

== Radio Show ==
Ovadia hosts her own radio show, the Stephanie O Show, on 103.9 FM, LI News Radio in the New York area. She is the co-host of this show with Adriane Schwartz. The celebrity news and talk radio show broadcast live on Wednesday from 10 pm to 11 pm and replayed every Sunday from 5 pm to 6 pm.

== In Media ==
Ovadia has appeared as a legal commentator on FOX 5. She has been in several print publications including the New York Times, TMZ, Newsday, CNBC, the New York Post, and NY Daily News.
